The Traveling Wilburys Vol. 1 is the debut studio album by the English-American supergroup Traveling Wilburys, comprising George Harrison, Jeff Lynne, Bob Dylan, Roy Orbison and Tom Petty. It was released in October 1988 to commercial success and critical acclaim. Although Harrison had long planned to start such a band, the project came about through happenstance. Harrison was in Los Angeles and in need of a B-side for a single from his Cloud Nine album, which resulted in the participants collaborating informally on the song "Handle with Care" at Dylan's home. Adopting alter egos as the five Wilbury brothers, they then recorded a full album, produced by Lynne and Harrison. It was the only Wilburys album to feature Orbison, who died suddenly of a heart attack less than two months after its release. The group continued as a four-piece after his death.

The Traveling Wilburys Vol. 1 was nominated for the Grammy Award for Album of the Year in 1989 and helped revitalise the careers of Dylan and Petty. It has been certified triple platinum by the Recording Industry Association of America.

Background
In early April 1988, George Harrison was in Los Angeles and needed to record a B-side for a European 12-inch single. Jeff Lynne was also in Los Angeles writing and producing some tracks for Roy Orbison on his album Mystery Girl (released posthumously), as well as Tom Petty’s first solo album, Full Moon Fever. While having dinner with Lynne and Orbison, Harrison related how he needed to record a new track and wanted to do it the next day. Harrison asked if Lynne would help, and Orbison offered his old friend his hand as well, seeing how fun it would be. Needing a studio at short notice, Harrison called Bob Dylan, who agreed to let them use his garage studio. After dinner, Harrison stopped by Petty’s house to pick up a guitar he had left there, and invited Petty along as well. Gathering at Dylan’s Malibu home the following day, Harrison, Lynne, Orbison and Petty worked on a song that Harrison had started writing for the occasion, "Handle with Care". At first, Dylan's role was that of a host, maintaining a barbecue to feed the musicians; at Harrison's invitation, Dylan then joined them in writing lyrics for the song. The ensemble taped the track on Dylan's Ampex recording equipment, with all five sharing the vocals.

"Handle with Care" was considered too good to be used as a B-side, so Harrison decided to form a band and record another nine songs for an album. The group got together again for nine days in May, recording the basic tracks and vocals at Dave Stewart’s home studio in Los Angeles. Overdubs and mixing were carried out in England at Harrison’s home studio, FPSHOT (short for Friar Park Studio, Henley-on-Thames).

Masquerading as the Wilbury brothers, the participants would be known as Nelson (Harrison), Otis (Lynne), Lucky (Dylan), Lefty (Orbison), and Charlie T. Jr. (Petty) Wilbury, with drummer Jim Keltner credited as Buster Sidebury. Harrison was no stranger to the use of alternate identities, as he had adopted them with Sgt. Pepper's Lonely Hearts Club Band and with his plethora of pseudonyms as a session musician, including L'Angelo Misterioso, George O'Hara and Hari Georgeson. During the Beatles' first tour of Scotland, in 1960, he had used the pseudonym "Carl Harrison", in reference to one of his favourite musicians, Carl Perkins. With the Traveling Wilburys, this concept was taken a step further, since the participants' real names do not appear anywhere on the album, liner notes, or the songwriting credits.

With Harrison having the greatest claim to the band, he signed them to Warner Bros. Records, which distributed his solo recordings, and incorporated their own Wilbury Records label, in addition to producing the sessions with Lynne that spring. Petty subsequently signed to Warner Bros. himself as a solo artist, and one of the company's subsidiaries, Reprise Records, released Lynne's solo album Armchair Theatre in 1990.

Songwriting
According to statements by Harrison in the documentary The True History of the Traveling Wilburys (filmed in 1988 about the making of the album and re-released on the bonus DVD included in The Traveling Wilburys Collection), the whole band gave various contributions to all songs, although each song was mainly written by a single member; the joint songwriting credit came from the fact that giving individualised credits looked egotistical.

Lynne commented that the songwriting process was relaxed and enjoyable:

We would arrive about twelve or one o'clock and have some coffee. Somebody would say, 'What about this?' and start on a riff. Then we'd all join in, and it'd turn into something. We'd finish around midnight and just sit for a bit while Roy would tell us fabulous stories about Sun Records or hanging out with Elvis. Then we'd come back the next day to work on another one. That's why the songs are so good and fresh—because they haven't been second-guessed and dissected and replaced. It's so tempting to add stuff to a song when you've got unlimited time.

However, the publishing credits on the Collection book are more revealing about the actual songwriters, as each of the credited publishers belongs to a single member:
Harrison's Umlaut Corporation (formerly Ganga Publishing) is credited for "Handle with Care", "Heading for the Light", "End of the Line" and the bonus track "Maxine", identifying him as the main writer of those songs. In a behind-the-scenes interview included among the bonus features on the 2003 DVD release of the 2002 tribute Concert for George, Petty recalls that the lyrics to "Handle with Care" were the result of a game held by Harrison during a barbecue outside his home studio, with all of the band members (including himself) shouting out lines and Harrison keeping the ones that stuck and writing them in a notebook. According to Petty, the line "Oh, the sweet smell of success" is his.
Dylan, credited via his Special Rider Music publisher, wrote "Dirty World" (according to Harrison and Lynne's recollections on the documentary, Dylan and all the other band members gave their input to the song by pitching in funny lines to complete the lyric line "He loves your ..."), the long narrative of "Tweeter and the Monkey Man" (which was apparently intended as either a parody of or tribute to Bruce Springsteen's early, verbose songs), "Congratulations", and the other bonus track "Like a Ship".
Petty, published by Gone Gator Music, wrote "Last Night" (again, with substantial lyrical contributions from the entire band) and "Margarita".
Lynne's publisher, Shard End Music (named after his birthplace), identifies him as the main writer of "Rattled" and "Not Alone Any More".

The separation was not repeated for the publishing credits of Traveling Wilburys Vol. 3, which show all songs as being published by all four publishers.

Release and aftermath

Released on October 18, 1988, Volume One became a surprise commercial success, reaching number 3 in the US and selling 2 million copies there within six months. The album also reached number 16 in the UK. With over 50 weeks on the US charts, The Traveling Wilburys Vol. 1 was later certified triple-platinum by the Recording Industry Association of America. While Harrison and Petty had recent successes, Dylan, Orbison (who died of a sudden heart attack on December 6, 1988) and Lynne had not seen an album climb that high in several years. At the time, no Dylan album had ever achieved two million in sales. As one critic put it, it was "one of the great commercial coups of the decade". The single "Handle with Care" was a significant hit in the UK charts, peaking at number 21, and an even bigger hit in Australia (number 3) and New Zealand (number 4), though it stalled at number 45 on the US Billboard Hot 100.

Most critics said the group's modest ambitions were fresh and relaxing. During 1989 and 1990 the album won many accolades, including a Grammy for Best Rock Performance by a Duo or Group. The album was also nominated for Album of the Year. In his book The Encyclopedia of Popular Music, Colin Larkin describes the Traveling Wilburys as "the last of the great supergroups" and writes of the band's accidental origins: "This wonderful potpourri of stars reintroduced 'having a good time' to their vocabulary and the result was not a Harrison solo album but the superb debut of the Traveling Wilburys. The outing proved to be a major success, bringing out the best of each artist; in particular, this [album] proved to be the marvellous swan song for Roy Orbison who tragically died soon afterwards."

After Harrison’s distribution deal with Warner Bros. expired in 1995, ownership of the Dark Horse Records catalogue as well as the two Traveling Wilburys albums reverted to Harrison and the albums went out of print. On June 12, 2007, Volume One and Vol. 3 were reissued by Rhino Records as The Traveling Wilburys Collection, packaged together with bonus tracks and a DVD. The box set debuted at number 1 on the UK Albums Chart and number 9 on the US Billboard 200.

Track listing

Personnel
Traveling Wilburys
Nelson Wilbury (George Harrison) – lead and harmony vocals, electric and acoustic guitars, slide guitar
Otis Wilbury (Jeff Lynne) – lead and harmony vocals, electric and acoustic guitars, bass guitar, keyboards; drums and cowbell on "Handle with Care"
Charlie T. Wilbury Jr (Tom Petty) – lead and harmony vocals, acoustic guitar
Lefty Wilbury (Roy Orbison) – lead and harmony vocals, acoustic guitar
Lucky Wilbury (Bob Dylan) – lead and harmony vocals, acoustic guitar, harmonica on "Handle with Care"

Additional personnel
Buster Sidebury (Jim Keltner) – drums (all tracks except "Handle with Care"), percussion
Jim Horn – saxophones
Ray Cooper – percussion
Ian Wallace – tom-toms on "Handle with Care"
Michael Palin (as Hugh Jampton, E.F. Norti-Bitz Reader in Applied Jacket) – album liner notes

Production
Produced by Otis and Nelson Wilbury (Jeff Lynne and George Harrison)
Engineers – Bill Bottrell, Don Smith (Los Angeles); Richard Dodd, Phil McDonald (Henley)

Accolades

Grammy Awards

|-
| rowspan="2" | 1990
| rowspan="2" | The Traveling Wilburys Vol. 1
| Best Rock Performance by a Duo or Group with Vocal
|  
|-
| Album of the Year 
| 
|}

American Music Awards

|-
| style="text-align:center;"|1990 || Traveling Wilburys (performer) || Favorite Pop/Rock New Artist || 
|-

Charts

Weekly charts

Year-end charts

Certifications

References

1988 debut albums
Traveling Wilburys albums
Albums produced by Jeff Lynne
Albums produced by George Harrison
Warner Records albums
Albums recorded at FPSHOT